Laška Vas pri Štorah is a small settlement in the hills immediately south of Štore in eastern Slovenia. The area is part of the traditional region of Styria. It is now included with the rest of the Municipality of Štore in the Savinja Statistical Region.

Name
The name of the settlement was changed from Laška vas to Laška vas pri Štorah in 1955.

Cultural heritage
Archaeological evidence near the village indicated a Migration Period burial ground.

References

External links
Laška Vas pri Štorah on Geopedia

Populated places in the Municipality of Štore